The Upper Dharmaram Formation is an Early Jurassic geologic formation found in Andhra Pradesh, India. It is of Sinemurian age (Early Jurassic), and dinosaur remains are among the fossils that have been recovered from the formation.

Upper Dharmaram Formation is not to be confused with D.Dharmaram. D.Dharmaram is a village in Ramayampet mandal of Medak District, in Andhra Pradesh.

Vertebrate fauna

See also 
 List of dinosaur-bearing rock formations

References

Bibliography 
 Weishampel, David B.; Dodson, Peter; and Osmólska, Halszka (eds.): The Dinosauria, 2nd, Berkeley: University of California Press. 861 pp. .

Geologic formations of India
Geography of Andhra Pradesh
Sinemurian Stage
Jurassic System of Asia
Sandstone formations
Mudstone formations
Paleontology in India
Environment of Andhra Pradesh